Diana Kent  is an English actress known for Heavenly Creatures (1994), How to Lose Friends & Alienate People (2008), One Day (2011) and for the ITV drama series Belgravia (2020).

Career

Film

Television

Theatre

References

External links
 
 

1958 births
British film actresses
English film actresses
English stage actresses
English television actresses
English voice actresses
Living people
Actresses from London
Royal Shakespeare Company members
English Shakespearean actresses
20th-century English actresses
21st-century English actresses